Agile Property Holdings Limited  is a land developer with its business focused in Guangdong Province, China. It was established in 1985 as a furniture maker in Zhongshan City, and entered the property business in 1992. On December 15, 2005, Agile Property was listed on the Hong Kong Stock Exchange.

Its headquarters are in Tianhe District, Guangzhou.

Introduction
Agile Property Holdings Limited was set up in 1992 as a property development company in China. It has developed over time into a diversified conglomerate in China. In 2005, Agile Property was listed on the Hong Kong Stock Exchange. The proposed price range for listing was HK$3.00 to 3.30.  Due to strong demand by investors for access to the China property market, it was finally priced at the high end of the range. The initial public offering size was US $403.5 million. The listing date was December 15, 2005.

As of close 2017, Agile had revenues of RMB 51.6 billion.

Diversified business
Agile has integrated its diverse business operations over time into the following 6 key business focuses:

 Property Development
 A-Living
 Environment Protection
 Education
 Construction
 Hotel Operations

Listings
Agile is listed on the Hong Kong Stock Exchange with exchange code 3383. It is constituent stock of the following indexes:

 Hang Seng Composite Index

See also
 Real estate in China

References

External links
 
Official website

Companies listed on the Hong Kong Stock Exchange
Real estate companies of China
Privately held companies of China
Companies based in Zhongshan